Love Is a Four Letter Word may refer to :

 Love Is a Four Letter Word (album), an album by Jason Mraz
 Love Is a Four Letter Word (TV series), an Australian TV series broadcast by ABC
 "Love Is a Four-Letter Word", an episode of The Janice Dickinson Modeling Agency
 Four-letter word, for other uses of the term

See also 
 "Love Is Just a Four-Letter Word", a song by Bob Dylan, notably recorded by Joan Baez
 "Love Is Not a Four Letter Word", a song by Raury from All We Need
 "Love Ain't Nothing But a Four Letter Word", a song by Bon Jovi released on the album 100,000,000 Bon Jovi Fans Can't Be Wrong
 "Love Ain't Just a Four Letter Word", a song by Jenny Wilson released on the album Love and Youth